Stenalia bisecta is a beetle in the genus Stenalia of the family Mordellidae. It was described in 1883.

References

bisecta
Beetles described in 1883